Aleksandr Nikolayevich Tikhonov (born 21 November 1963) is a former Russian football player and coach.

External links
 

1963 births
Living people
Soviet footballers
FC Rostov players
Russian footballers
Russian Premier League players
Russian expatriate footballers
Expatriate footballers in Finland
FC SKA Rostov-on-Don players
Association football forwards
FC Taganrog players